The Long Henderson Longster HL-1 is an American aircraft that was designed by Leslie Long and Ivan Diggs for homebuilt construction.

Design and development
The Henderson Longster is a conventional landing gear equipped, wire braced parasol wing aircraft. Aeronautical designer Ivan Diggs designed a new 30 ft wing for the Longster. The fuselage is steel tubing. The design also features pinned and brazed gusset joints as opposed to conventionally welded joint clusters.

Variants
Henderson Longster
Harlequin Longster
Used a Long designed homebuilt engine, the Long Harlequin 933.

Aircraft on display
An example of a Longster is on display at the Western Antique Aeroplane & Automobile Museum.

Specifications (Long Henderson Longster)

See also

References

Further reading
1931 Flying and Gliding Manual

External links
Photo of a Longster

Homebuilt aircraft